Alejandro "Alex" Ybarra (born 1961) is an American politician serving as a member of the Washington House of Representatives from the 13th district, which includes Lincoln and Kittitas counties and parts of Grant County and Yakima County.

Early life and education 
Ybarra was born and raised in Quincy, Washington. He earned a Bachelor of Science in mathematics from Central Washington University and a Master of Business Administration from the University of Phoenix.

Career 
Ybarra worked as an engineer at Rocket Research Company, specializing in the development of military and aerospace products. Ybarra has worked as the reliability and compliance auditor for the Grant County Public Utility District since 2003. Ybarra was selected to serve in the Washington House of Representatives on January 14, 2019, succeeding Matt Manweller, who resigned from the House amid revelations that Manweller had engaged in a sexual relationship with an underage student.

Awards 
 2020 Guardians of Small Business. Presented by NFIB.

References 

1961 births
Living people
21st-century American politicians
Republican Party members of the Washington House of Representatives
Central Washington University alumni
University of Phoenix alumni
People from Grant County, Washington
Latino conservatism in the United States